NiQuitin is a range of nicotine replacement products designed to help smokers quit by replacing the nicotine supplied by cigarettes with a lower, steadier level in order to relieve withdrawal. This is to help users wean off nicotine gradually. Nicotine replacement therapy products (e.g. chewing gum, lozenges, transdermal systems) are indicated as temporary aids for the cigarette smoker who wants to give up smoking. They serve as alternative sources of nicotine and provide relief of nicotine withdrawal symptoms in nicotine-dependent individuals who are acutely withdrawing from cigarette smoking.

NiQuitin is available as patches, gums and lozenges.

History

NiQuitin was approved by the FDA in 1991, touted as the original "nicotine transdermal system."

Created by GlaxoSmithKline, NiQuitin was the second product to provide an alternative to the withdrawal symptoms of quitting smoking. Nicotine gums were already quite popular with consumers.

Shortly after NiQuitin’s release, NiQuitin Clear was released, as some users complained about the patch's inability to match a wide variety of skin colors. Over the past several years, NiQuitin has become the most popular topical nicotine alternative. Also shortly after NiQuitin's release, many other pharmaceutical companies began releasing many nicotine replacement therapies including Nicotine gum, lozenges, inhalers and nasal sprays.

The product is sold globally under different brand names such as Nicoderm in the US, Nicabate in Australia and New Zealand and NiQuitin CQ in China, many parts of Europe and South America.

Criticism
Nicotine is the addictive drug in tobacco products. According to the research consensus, many of the constituents of tobacco smoke are carcinogenic. Nicotine itself has not been shown to be carcinogenic, but it has been suggested that it may cause more favorable conditions for cancerous growth. The drawback to NRT products is that they don't cure an individual's addiction to nicotine, but simply substitute cigarettes with an alternative nicotine delivery vehicle. 'Willpower' is still required to eliminate a nicotine addiction. Generally it is argued that NRT products are safer than smoking tobacco because NRT does not contain Tar. Typically, the cost of NRT lasting seven days is between £10 and £20 depending upon the NRT product. In comparison, smoking can typically cost £15 to £56 for a smoker consuming 40-160 cigarettes per week. This is about £7.50 for 25 grams of tax paid rolling tobacco. The cost of cigarettes or tobacco over the same period varies depending on the smoker and brand of cigarette, whilst the cost of NRT remains static regardless of the level of nicotine it contains because the varying delivery systems, nicotine quantity per use and brands of NRT are typically similar in cost. This leads to the relative cost of NRT versus cigarettes or tobacco being dependent on how much the individual smokes. The British NHS provides notable help in the form of prescriptions which reduces the cost to £7.65 per script or less depending upon the individual's financial circumstance. If several products are included on one script then the price will drop well below that of actual cigarettes.

Smoking is in essence an addiction to nicotine.  NRT does not address this addiction it simply replaces one form of nicotine dosage with another, thus maintaining dependency on the drug.  As a result, NRT companies are simply competing with tobacco companies for the nicotine market, rather than providing a way of eliminating a user's nicotine addiction.

References

External links
 Nicotine
 Nicoderm CQ
 Niquitin
 Nicabate
 GSK Product Information
 Whyquit

Smoking cessation